was a public junior college in Himeji, Hyōgo, Japan.

History 
The college opened in April 1950. It closed in 1999.

Courses offered 
 Food and nutrition
 Home making
 Child care
 Business administration and information science

See also 
 Hyogo University
 List of junior colleges in Japan

References

External links 
 University of Hyogo website 

Educational institutions established in 1950
Japanese junior colleges
1950 establishments in Japan
Universities and colleges in Hyōgo Prefecture
Public universities in Japan
1999 disestablishments in Japan